Karl Anton Florian Eckert (17 December 1820 – 14 October 1879) was a German conductor and composer.

Life
Eckert was born in Berlin. By the age of five, had already proved himself as a musical child prodigy. After coming to the attention of Sing-Akademie zu Berlin director Carl Friedrich Zelter, he was entered into the academy in 1832, and with Zelter's support had his debut piano concert in the fall of that year.

He was later appointed Kapellmeister of Staatsoper Unter den Linden where he remained until the spring of 1848. After the end of the political turmoil of the Revolutions of 1848, Eckert left Berlin for Amsterdam, and later Brussels.

Eckert died in Berlin at age 58.

Selected works
 Das Fischermädchen, singspiel
 Das Käthchen von Nürnberg
 Der Laborant von Riesengebirge, opera
 Scharlatan, opera
 Wilhelm von Oranien, opera

References

External links
 

1820 births
1879 deaths
19th-century classical composers
19th-century conductors (music)
19th-century German composers
German conductors (music)
German male classical composers
German male conductors (music)
German Romantic composers
Musicians from Berlin